Rhosymedre Halt was a minor railway station on the Great Western Railway's London to Birkenhead main line, serving the mining village of Rhosymedre near Cefn Mawr in Wales. Although the station is gone, the railway remains open as part of the Shrewsbury to Chester Line. The station was situated in a deep cutting amidst a number of overbridges, but nothing now remains of the old platforms.

Express trains did not call at Rhosymedre, and the halt would have been served only by West Midlands & Shrewsbury to Wrexham & Chester local trains. Some proposals for a "Wrexham South railway station" involve the use of the former Rhosymedre Halt railway station site or slightly south of it.

Neighbouring stations

References

Further reading

External links
 Rhosymedre Halt station on navigable 1946 O.S. map

Disused railway stations in Wrexham County Borough
Former Great Western Railway stations
Railway stations in Great Britain opened in 1906
Railway stations in Great Britain closed in 1959